Young European Leadership (YEL) is an international non-profit and nonpartisan organization composed of and founded by young Europeans. Its aim is to empower youth through high-level leadership opportunities to affect change in their communities. Among its activities, YEL organizes the European Union's delegations to the Y7 and Y20 Summits, as well as youth-centered delegations to the annual COP conferences, the European Health Parliament, and other events, including the Paris Peace Forum.

History
Following the 2011 Y8 and Y20 Summits held in Paris, France, the initiative "Youth AEGIS" was founded by Radoslav Šoth. Its main goal was to recruit the delegates of the European Union for the next editions of the Y8 and Y20 Summits. After a change in leadership in 2012, the initiative was renamed Young European Leadership and developed into an organization. The new association was legally established in Brussels as an AISBL (international non-profit organization) the year after, in February 2013. The Co-Founders were Tillmann Heidelk (President), Flóra Rétvalvi as Vice President, Jeroen Stevens as Secretary General and Treasurer, and Radoslav Šoth as member. Diana Carter was also part of the organization from the beginning.

Since 2020, Young European Leadership has expanded its digital activities, including through hosting regular "Thursday Night Live" segments on its social media platforms.

Main aim of the organisation is to help and empower young youth so that they can bring change in the local community, through prospective measures.

Current Activities
Young European Leadership aims to empower youth by providing them with high-level leadership development opportunities and to connect young people with decision-makers in the European Union and abroad. The organization trains young Europeans in leadership skills including public speaking and negotiation skills, and organizes a number of delegations and events to achieve this aim.

Y7 and Y20 Summits
The Youth Seven (Y7) and Youth Twenty (Y20) Summits – formerly G8 and G20 Youth Summits – are international youth conferences.

The Y7 and Y20 Summits are the official Group of Seven (G7) and Group of Twenty (G20) youth events. Young adults aged 18 to 29 are encouraged to provide innovative solutions to global challenges. Their proposals are then presented to the Heads of State of all G7 and G20 countries.

UNFCCC COP Delegations
Young European Leadership organizes a high-level youth delegation to the annual United Nations Climate Change conference.

European Health Parliament Delegations
Young European Leadership organizes a high-level youth delegation to the European Health Parliament.

Other Events
In addition, Young European Leadership organizes and participates in various youth-focused events. These include events hosted by the European Business Summit, the OECD, the Paris Peace Forum, and the European Committee of the Regions.

Former Activities

Young European Council
The Young European Council was a simulation of the European Council for young people.  The different national positions on a variety of issues discussed at the European level such as energy, the question of the Euro or EU-bilateral relations, are covered. Young European Leadership organized the Young European Council (YEC) 2014 in Brussels. It gathered students and young professionals from all over Europe to address three challenges: education to employment, digital revolution and technologies, and sustainable development in cities; exchanging with policy-makers from the European institutions and think-tank experts. Guest speakers included the then-European Commissioner for Climate Action, Ms. Connie Hedegaard.

European Development Days
Young European Leadership has frequently sent a youth delegation to the European Development Days. The European Development Days are Europe's forum for international affairs and development cooperation. This initiative is sponsored by the European Commission and its premier goal is to consolidate the general view on development issues and create a unified approach to achieve more effective international cooperation.

YEL Society
The YEL Society was a project to bring together university students as well as young professionals involved in European and global politics. The Young European Leadership Society (YEL Society) believes that young people must be given the chance to design the world they are living in.

Organisation

Board
President: Eloïse Ryon 
Secretary General: Sonia Stoyanova 
Vice-President of Strategy: Pauline Kühlwein 
Treasurer: Josias Knöppler

European and International Partners

European Partners
Athens Network of Collaborating Experts (ANCE)
Bulle Media
EU40
European Business Summit
European Health Parliament
Finance Watch
Global Diplomatic Forum
Prague European Summit

International Partners
Internet Society
Youth Climate Movement

Notable alumni
Emma Wiesner , Member of the European Parliament (Renew Europe)
Tillman Heidelk , First President of Young European Leadership
Diana Carter , Former Secretary-General and Treasurer
Radoslav Šoth 
Flóra Rétfalvi 
Luiza Niță

References

Organizations established in 2013
Non-profit organisations based in Belgium
International organisations based in Belgium
Youth empowerment organizations
International nongovernmental youth organizations
Youth model government
G20
G7 summits